Daniel Hollands (January 20, 1927 – July 7, 2006) was a Canadian federal politician from 1972 to 1974.

Hollands ran for a seat in the House of Commons of Canada in the 1972 federal election, winning the district of Pembina.

He left the Progressive Conservative caucus on May 9, 1974 and ran for re-election in the 1974 federal election without party affiliation, but was defeated by Progressive Conservative candidate Peter Elzinga. Hollands finished in third place in a field of eight candidates, losing approximately 16,000 votes from the previous election.

Electoral record

External links

1927 births
2006 deaths
Members of the House of Commons of Canada from Alberta
Progressive Conservative Party of Canada MPs